John Maxcy Zane (March 26, 1863December 6, 1937) was an American lawyer.

Zane was born in Springfield, Illinois. He was admitted to the bar in 1888 and spent eleven years practicing law in the state of Utah. Zane would spend the remainder of his career in Chicago, teaching briefly at the Northwestern University School of Law and the University of Chicago.

Zane specialized in patent, trademark, and commercial law.

Zane is best known among legal historians for his highly critical review (Michigan Law Review, 13 (1915) 439-465) of George Deiser's edition of the Year Books of Richard II: 12 Richard II (A.D. 1388-1389) (Ames Foundation [Harvard Law School], 1914). That review was still being cited as an authority in Maurice Holland's edition of Year Books of Richard II: 7 Richard II (A.D. 1383-1384) (Ames Foundation, 1989), ix, n. 2; x; 3 n. 3.

Sources 

Zane, John Maxcy. The Story of Law. Ed. Charles J. Reid. Second ed. 1998.
John Maxcy Zane, The Multiplication of Laws and Lawyers (1927)
John maxcy zane. (2014). Retrieved 11/21, 2014, from http://oll.libertyfund.org/people/john-maxcy-zane

Zane. "The Grandeur That Was Rome". The Caxton Club: Chicago, 1927.

1863 births
1937 deaths
People from Springfield, Illinois
American lawyers